Sant Martí Sarroca is a municipality in the comarca of Alt Penedès, Barcelona, Catalonia, Spain.

References

External links
 Government data pages 

Municipalities in Alt Penedès